Gazelle District is one of four administrative districts that make up the province of East New Britain Province in Papua New Guinea. The  headquarters of Gazelle district is located in Kerevat town, located approximately 35 km from Kokopo, the province's main commercial center.

See also
Districts of Papua New Guinea

Districts of Papua New Guinea